Francesco III d'Este (Francesco Maria; 2 July 1698 – 22 February 1780) was Duke of Modena and Reggio from 1737 until his death.

Biography
He was born in Modena, the son of Rinaldo d'Este, Duke of Modena, and Duchess Charlotte of Brunswick-Lüneburg.

During his reign, the duchy was bankrupted by the Wars of the Spanish, Polish, and Austrian Successions. As a result, Francesco was forced to sell the most precious artworks of the Estense Gallery. He was a careful administrator but most of the duchy's financial policy was in the hands of the Austrian plenipotentiary, Beltrame Cristiani.

Among his measures, the urban renovation of Modena and the construction of the Via Vandelli, connecting the city to Tuscany.

Francesco also was the interim Governor of the Duchy of Milan between 1754 and 1771.

He died in 1780 in his villa at Varese. His son Prince Ercole succeeded him.

Family and children
In 1721, he married Charlotte Aglaé d'Orléans (1700–1761), a daughter of Philippe d'Orléans, Duke of Orléans and Françoise Marie de Bourbon (illegitimate daughter of Louis XIV and Madame de Montespan) and had ten children. 

He acted as proxy groom for his sister Henrietta Maria d'Este in 1728 who was marrying Antonio Farnese, Duke of Parma.

After his first wife's death, he remarried twice more morganatically to Teresa Castelbarco (1704-1768) and Renata Teresa d'Harrach (1721-1788). His granddaughter Maria Beatrice d'Este, Duchess of Massa was the last of the Este of Modena.

Issue

Alfonso d'Este (18 November 1723 – 16 June 1725) died in infancy.
Francesco Constantino d'Este (22 November 1724 – 16 June 1725) died in infancy.
Maria Teresa Felicitas d'Este (6 October 1726 – 30 April 1754) married Louis Jean Marie de Bourbon, Duke of Penthièvre and had issue.
Ercole III d'Este, Duke of Modena (22 November 1727 – 14 October 1803) married Maria Teresa Cybo-Malaspina, Duchess of Massa and had issue.
Matilde d'Este (7 February 1729 – 14 November 1803) died unmarried.
Beatrice d'Este (14 July 1730 – 12 July 1731) died in infancy.
Beatrice d'Este (24 November 1731 – 3 April 1736) died in infancy.
Maria Fortunata d'Este (24 November 1731 – 21 September 1803) married Louis François de Bourbon, Prince of Conti, no issue.
Benedetto Filippo d'Este (30 September 1736 – 16 September 1751) died unmarried.
Maria Elisabetta Ernestina d'Este (12 February 1741 – 4 August 1774) married Carlo Salomone, Count of Serravalle and had issue. Direct ancestors of Sergio E. M. Salomone Montes de Oca, current Count of Serravalle, Vintebbio and Bornate.

Ancestry

References

External links

1698 births
1780 deaths
18th-century Italian people
Francesco 3
Francesco 3
Francesco 3
Hereditary Princes of Modena
Francesco 3
Knights of the Golden Fleece of Austria
Generals of the Holy Roman Empire
Fellows of the Royal Society